The 1921 European Wrestling Championships were held in Offenbach (Germany) in 1921 under the organization of the International Federation of Associated Wrestling (FILA) and the German Wrestling Federation. It only competed in the Greco-Roman style categories.

Medal summary

Men's Greco-Roman

References

External links
FILA Database

1921 in European sport
Sports competitions in Germany